Mykola Vasylyovych Bahrov (26 October 1937 – 21 April 2015) was a Soviet and Ukrainian politician. He was a chairman of the Verkhovna Rada of Crimea in 1990–1994 and Governor of Crimea Oblast 1989–1991.

Biography
Bahrov was born to a Russian family in the town of Novotroitske, Kherson Oblast on 26 October 1937. He died in 2015, aged 77.

See also
 1994 Crimean presidential election

Notes

References

External links
 Ukraine at worldstatesmen.org

1937 births
2015 deaths
People from Kherson Oblast
Moscow State University alumni
Taras Shevchenko National University of Kyiv alumni
Tavrida National V.I. Vernadsky University alumni
Academic staff of Tavrida National V.I. Vernadsky University
Tavrida National V.I. Vernadsky University people
Ukrainian State Institute of Mineral Resources research associates
Communist Party of Ukraine (Soviet Union) politicians
Central Committee of the Communist Party of the Soviet Union members
Governors of Crimean Oblast
First convocation members of the Verkhovna Rada
Eleventh convocation members of the Verkhovna Rada of the Ukrainian Soviet Socialist Republic
Heads of universities and colleges in Ukraine

Recipients of the Order of Merit (Ukraine), 3rd class
Recipients of the Order of Prince Yaroslav the Wise, 5th class
Recipients of the Order of the Red Banner of Labour
Recipients of the Order of State
Laureates of the State Prize of Ukraine in Science and Technology
Recipients of the Honorary Diploma of the Cabinet of Ministers of Ukraine